Ellis Wade Harrison (born 29 January 1994) is a Welsh professional footballer who plays as a centre-forward for  club Port Vale. He represented Wales at under-21 level, scoring three goals in fourteen games.

Harrison began his career at Bristol Rovers, making his senior debut at the age of 17 in April 2011. He scored twenty goals in forty matches as Rovers secured promotion into the English Football League through the Conference Premier play-offs in the 2014–15 season, including a goal in the play-off final. He was briefly loaned out to Hartlepool United in the 2015–16 campaign, though would score eight goals for Rovers as they secured promotion out of League Two. He then scored twenty goals at League One level over the course of the next two seasons, securing a £750,000 transfer move to Ipswich Town in July 2018. However he scored just one goal for the Championship club and returned to League One on a £450,000 transfer to Portsmouth in June 2019. He scored 20 goals in 84 games for the club, before joining Fleetwood Town for an undisclosed fee in January 2022. He moved on to Port Vale for another undisclosed fee eight months later.

Club career

Bristol Rovers

Early years (2011–2014)
Harrison began his career at Bristol Rovers and made his senior debut for the Pirates in League One on 16 April 2011, in a 1–0 defeat to Southampton at St Mary's Stadium, when he came on as a 75th-minute substitute for Jo Kuffour. This was the first time he had been in a first-team matchday squad, having been included after impressing caretaker-manager Stuart Campbell during a reserve team game four days earlier.

With the club now in League Two, Ellis made his first league start on 12 January 2013 in a 3–0 victory against Fleetwood Town, setting up Danny Woodards to score the first goal after only five minutes of play. He scored his first goal for the club two weeks later on 26 January, in a 3–1 victory away at Rotherham United. He scored both goals in a 2–1 victory over Rochdale at the Memorial Stadium on 16 March. Manager John Ward went on to praise his maturity, predicting a "good future" for the teenager.

Prior to the 2013–14 season, Harrison agreed a new three-year contract with Rovers. He featured in 25 league games, but scored just once, again against Fleetwood Town. Rovers ended the season relegated to the Conference Premier, ending their 94-year stay in the English Football League. Harrison meanwhile was placed on the transfer list by manager Darrell Clarke.

Conference promotion (2014–15)

Harrison initially featured sporadically at the start of the 2014–15 season, but scored late winners against F.C. Halifax Town and Lincoln City in August and September respectively. He scored his first professional hat-trick in the FA Cup fixture away to Dorchester Town. Harrison ended the season with 17 goals in league and cup, including six in the final five league fixtures as Rovers finished just one point off top of the league and with it automatic promotion. Harrison was sent off in the play-off semi-final game with Forest Green Rovers, but returned for the final at Wembley Stadium where he scored the crucial equalising goal against Grimsby Town. Rovers went on to win the game on penalties to return to the English Football League at the first time of asking.

League Two promotion (2015–16)

The 2015–16 season saw Harrison regularly feature, both in the starting line-up and from the substitutes bench, until toward the end of 2015 when he was often an unused substitute. On 17 January 2016, he agreed to join fellow League Two side Hartlepool United on a month-long loan with a view to attaining more game time. He did not impress Pools manager Ronnie Moore during his time at Victoria Park. As Ellis returned to Rovers from his loan spell, he scored a crucial late equaliser against league leaders Northampton Town. This proved to be important for the club's automatic promotion race, as Rovers went up on goal difference with a victory over Dagenham & Redbridge on the final day. Harrison scored eight goals in 32 games for Rovers, also appearing twice for Hartlepool.

League One (2016–2018)

Harrison scored his first League One goal of the 2016–17 season in a 2–1 defeat to Bolton Wanderers on 17 August. On 7 January, he scored four goals in a 5–0 victory over Northampton Town. He signed a new deal in June 2017 following what he called a "very disappointing" season in which he scored nine goals in 42 games. He won the January 2018 goal of the month award for League One with his solo effort against Doncaster Rovers late on in a 3–1 victory. He ended the 2017–18 campaign with 14 goals in 49 matches, helping the Gas to a 13th-place league finish. Throughout his eight seasons at the club he scored 52 goals in 205 league and cup appearances.

Ipswich Town
On 23 July 2018, Harrison signed a two-year deal (with an option for a third year) with Championship club Ipswich Town, joining the club for an undisclosed fee believed to be in the region of £750,000. Manager Paul Hurst said he "has got a little bit of everything" as he looked to make him the focal point of his team's attack. However Harrison was dropped after five games and played out of position on the left side of midfield before he suffered an ankle ligament injury in training in September, which ruled him out of action for two months. He scored his first goal at Portman Road in a 1–1 draw with Sheffield United on 22 December. That would be his only goal for the Tractor Boys during his nine starts and eight substitute appearances throughout the 2018–19 relegation campaign as he was struck down with a back injury in February. The club looked to move him on after new manager Paul Lambert decided Harrison was not in his first-team plans. Harrison later credited coach Marcus Stewart with improving his game.

Portsmouth
On 21 June 2019, Harrison signed for League One side Portsmouth for an undisclosed fee, believed to be worth £450,000. Manager Kenny Jackett had originally attempted to sign him in January 2018. Harrison scored his first Portsmouth goals in his second game, a 3–0 victory over Birmingham City in an EFL Cup first round fixture at Fratton Park on 6 August. He scored ten goals in 39 appearances during the 2019–20 season, which was stopped early due to the COVID-19 pandemic in England, with Portsmouth finishing in the play-offs on points per game. He played both legs of the play-off semi-final defeat to Oxford United, which was decided on penalties following a 2–2 aggregate draw; he provided an assist and then scored an own goal in the second leg before being substituted.

He scored six goals in 31 games during the 2020–21 campaign, which saw Pompey miss out on the play-offs by two points. In June 2021, Harrison looked set to join Oxford United, however this move fell through following Portsmouth's failure to bring in replacement Jayden Stockley. He was linked with moves to League One rivals Plymouth Argyle and Sheffield Wednesday among others, but opted to stay at Portsmouth. On 7 September, he scored a third career hat-trick in a 5–3 EFL Trophy defeat to AFC Wimbledon. He scored a total of four goals in fourteen appearances in the first half of the 2021–22 season, though he started just one league fixture, and opted to leave the club after manager Danny Cowley told him he would not be offered a new contract in the summer.

Fleetwood Town
On 8 January 2022, Harrison joined League One side Fleetwood Town for an undisclosed fee. He made his debut that day, scoring the only goal in a relegation six-pointer victory over Doncaster Rovers. Manager Stephen Crainey said that "hopefully, he can follow that up and build on it with a few more". With Fleetwood having survived relegation on goal difference, Harrison signed a new one-year contract with the club at the end of the 2021–22 season, having scored six goals in eighteen matches since arriving at the Highbury Stadium.

Port Vale
On 11 August 2022, Harrison signed for League One club Port Vale for an undisclosed fee. Manager Darrell Clarke said: "I know a lot about Ellis because I made him, no disrespect to him, but Ellis would tell you that himself". He scored his first goal for the Valiants in a 2–1 defeat at Milton Keynes Dons six days later. He developed an effective strike partnership with James Wilson and was named as Vale's Player of the Month for both August and September.

International career
Harrison was called up to the Wales under-21 squad for the fixture against Moldova on 22 March 2013. He made his Wales under-21 debut on 11 October 2013, in a 2–0 win over Lithuania. He scored his first international goal while gaining his second cap in the 4–0 win over San Marino four days later in a 2015 UEFA European Under-21 Championship qualification game at Nantporth. He scored two further goals in the nation's unsuccessful qualification attempt for the 2017 UEFA European Under-21 Championship, in victories home and away against Armenia. He won a total of fourteen caps at under-21 level, scoring three goals.

Style of play
Harrison has been described as a "physical" centre-forward by manager Darrell Clarke, who praised his stamina. He is a good all-round attacker who can hold the ball up well.

Career statistics

Honours
Bristol Rovers
Conference Premier play-offs: 2015
Football League Two third-place promotion: 2015–16

References

1994 births
Living people
Footballers from Newport, Wales
Welsh footballers
Association football forwards
English Football League players
National League (English football) players
Bristol Rovers F.C. players
Hartlepool United F.C. players
Ipswich Town F.C. players
Portsmouth F.C. players
Fleetwood Town F.C. players
Port Vale F.C. players
Wales youth international footballers
Wales under-21 international footballers
Welsh people of Jamaican descent
British sportspeople of Jamaican descent